Ibrāhīm ibn Muḥammad, was the son of the Islamic prophet Muhammad and Maria al-Qibtiyya. He died at the age of 2.

Eclipse occurrence 

In his book "Al-Bidāya wa-n-Nihāya" Ibn Kathir mentions that Ibrahim died on Thursday 10 Rabi' al-Awwal 10 AH, and on the same day right after his death, an eclipse of the sun occurred, so people at the moment started talking that Allah is showing his condolences to his prophet by eclipsing the Sun. Muhammad, not wanting his companions to fall into Fitna by ascribing divinities to him or his son, stood at the mosque and said:

Illness and death 

Muhammad's wife, and the mother of believers, Ibrahim's mother was an Egyptian woman who came from Byzantine official to Muhammad in 628. According to Ibn Kathir, quoting Ibn Sa'd, he was born in the last month of the year 8 AH, equivalent of 630 CE. Muslim scholars such as Muslim ibn al-Hajjaj and Al-Nasa'i mention that Al-Waqidi is not reliable and is not trustworthy to be quoted. The child was named after Abraham (or Ibrahim in Arabic) the Biblical prophet revered in Jewish, Christian and Muslim traditions. Ibrahim was placed in the care of a nurse called Umm Sayf, wife of Abu Sayf, the blacksmith, in the tradition of the Arabs of the time, to whom Muhammad gave some goats to complement her milk supply. When he fell ill he was moved to a date orchard near the residence of his mother, under the care of her and her sister Sirin. When it was clear that he would not likely survive, Muhammad was informed. His reaction to the news is reported as:

Burial

Muhammad is also reported as having informed Maria and Sirin that Ibrahim would have his own nurse in Paradise. Different accounts relate that the ghusl for Ibrahim was performed by either Umm Burdah, or al-Fadl ibn ʿAbbas, in preparation for burial. Thereafter, he was carried to the cemetery upon a little bier by Muhammad, his uncle al-ʿAbbas, and others. Here, after a funeral prayer led by Muhammad, he was interred. Muhammad then filled the grave with sand, sprinkled some water upon it, and placed a landmark on it, saying that "Tombstones do neither good nor ill, but they help appease the living. Anything that man does, God wishes him to do well."

Siblings

Qasim ibn Muhammad
Abd Allah ibn Muhammad
Zainab bint Muhammad
Ruqayya bint Muhammad
Umm Kulthum bint Muhammad
Fatimah al-Zahra bint Muhammad

See also
Islam and children

References

External links 
The Tribe of Quraish

Children of Muhammad
630 births
632 deaths
Arab people of Egyptian descent
Burials at Jannat al-Baqī
Child deaths